GridApp Systems, Inc. was a database automation software company.  It was purchased by BMC Software in December, 2010.

Founded in 2002 and headquartered in New York City, GridApp Systems was the brainchild of five former employees of Register.com, Rob Gardos, Shamoun Murtza, Matthew Zito, Dan Cohen, and Eric Gross. The five realized that 85% of the routine tasks performed by database administrators could be automated, decreasing critical errors and improving productivity; all five functioned as GridApp’s CEO, CTO, Chief Scientist, Director of Development, and Mr. Database respectively.

GridApp's flagship product is GridApp Clarity, which has won the following awards and recognition:
 SearchSQLServer ― 2006 ― "Performance and Tuning" Category ― Silver 
 ServerWatch ― 2008 ― "Automation and Compliance" category ― Silver
 CODiE ― 2008 ― "Best Database Management Software" category ― Finalist
 EMA ― 2008 ― "EMA Rising Star"

References

Software companies established in 2002
American companies established in 2002
Software companies based in New York (state)
2002 establishments in New York City
2010 mergers and acquisitions
Defunct software companies of the United States